I'm Dying Up Here is an American comedy-drama television series created by David Flebotte. The pilot was written by Flebotte and directed by Jonathan Levine. It  premiered on Showtime on June 4, 2017. The series is executive produced by Flebotte, Jim Carrey, Michael Aguilar, and Christina Wayne. It was announced on January 12, 2016, that Showtime had ordered the pilot to series based on the bestselling nonfiction book by William Knoedelseder of the same title. On September 8, 2017, Showtime renewed the series for a 10-episode second season. The second season premiered on May 6, 2018. On September 28, 2018, Showtime announced that  it  had canceled the series.

Premise
I'm Dying Up Here explores the Los Angeles stand-up scene circa 1973 as a group of young comedians attempt to become successful at Goldie's comedy club and potentially gain a star-making turn on Johnny Carson's Tonight Show. Club owner Goldie mentors the young comics with a combination of toughness and encouragement to further their chances at success. The show focuses on the daily struggles and successes of the comics, Goldie, and the cutthroat competitors in the industry.

Cast and characters

Main
 Melissa Leo as Golda 'Goldie' Herschlag: a brassy comedy club owner (loosely based on Mitzi Shore).
 Ari Graynor as Cassie Feder: an ambitious comedian from Wink, Texas, and Clay's ex-girlfriend.
 Clark Duke as Ron Shack: a Boston comic who travels with Eddie to LA.
 Michael Angarano as Eddie Zeidel: a Boston comic and Clay's friend who travels with Ron to LA.
 Andrew Santino as Billy Hobbs: a comedy club favorite.
 Stephen Guarino as 'Sully' Patterson: a zany stand-up comedian (season one; guest for season two).
 Erik Griffin as Ralph Carnegie: a Vietnam vet, comic, and writer for Sonny & Cher.
 RJ Cyler as Adam Proteau: a struggling stand-up comedian.
 Al Madrigal as Edgar 'Manny' Martinez: a loose-cannon comedian
 Jake Lacy as Nick Beverly: a  stand-up comedian who returns to Los Angeles after being on the road.

Recurring
 Ginger Gonzaga as Maggie: Arnie's / Ron's girlfriend, a waitress at the club 
 Jon Daly as Arnie: a struggling comic
 Obba Babatundé as Barton Royce
 W. Earl Brown as Teddy
 Jeffrey Nordling as Eli Goldman
 Rick Overton as Mitch Bombadier: an executive for The Tonight Show
 Dylan Baker as Johnny Carson: the host of The Tonight Show.
 Brianne Howey as Kay: a waitress at the club
 Ryan Alosio as Miles Farber: an ambitious talent agent
 Tommy Snider as Wolfman Jack: a famous disc jockey in Los Angeles
 Brad Garrett as Reinaldo Stanziani / Roy Martin (season two): a legendary comedian who comes to the club and offers the up-and-coming comedians advice. Goldie attempts to join into a partnership with him as she expands her business pursuits.
 Nicole Ari Parker as Gloria Whitfield (season two): a producer for Soul Train who enters into a relationship with one of the comics
 Stefania LaVie Owen as Amanda Robbins (season 2): Goldie's estranged daughter who reenters her life after running away at 17.
 Xosha Roquemore as Dawn Lima (season two): a female comic who is new to Los Angeles and struggling with her sexual identity as she enters into a sexual relationship with Nick
 Dana Gould as Bruce (season two): Adam's agent
 Beau Mirchoff as Saul Hudson (season two): a TV producer for whom Ralph works

Guest

 Joey "Coco" Diaz as 'Taffy'
 Sebastian Stan as Calogero 'Clay' Apuzzo: Cassie's ex-boyfriend, who hits stardom with his first Tonight Show appearance and subsequently dies by suicide
 Alfred Molina as Carl: a mediocre talent manager
 Robert Forster as Guy Apuzzo: Clay's father
 Cathy Moriarty as Angie Apuzzo: Clay's mother
 Scott Cohen as Roy Brenner
 Tyrone Evans Clark as the Clubgoer (Guest Star)
 David Paymer as Ernie Falk
 Richard Kind as Marty Dansak
 Dom Irrera as James Seamus 'Fitzy' Fitzpatrick (9 episodes)
 Sarah Hay as Tawny
 Sarah Stiles as Toni 'The Tiger' Luddy: a comedy club groupie
 Jere Burns as Sid Robbins
 Jocko Sims as Melvin
 John Caponera as Howard Leetch
 Armen Weitzman as Rob Cheevers
 Dennis Haskins as Father Jacobs
 Ken Lerner as Sam Doak
 Brandon Ford Green as Richard Pryor
 Chris Regan as Monty Hall

Episodes

Season 1 (2017)

Season 2 (2018)

References

External links 
 
 

2017 American television series debuts
2018 American television series endings
2010s American comedy-drama television series
English-language television shows
Showtime (TV network) original programming
Television shows based on non-fiction books
Television series set in the 1970s
Television shows set in Los Angeles
Television series by Reveille Productions